Jakob Hlasek was the defending champion but did not compete that year.

Christo van Rensburg won in the final 6–4, 7–6, 6–3 against Paul Chamberlin.

Seeds

  Jay Berger (second round)
  Kevin Curren (second round)
  Christo van Rensburg (champion)
  Paolo Canè (first round)
  Amos Mansdorf (first round)
 n/a
  Todd Witsken (first round)
  Scott Davis (first round)

Draw

Final

Section 1

Section 2

External links
 1989 South African Open Draw

1989
1989 Grand Prix (tennis)